Agropolis International, formerly called Agropolis, is an association that was founded in 1986 by :Louis Malassis and research and higher education institutes.

Publications 
Agropolis International publishes directories of scientific competences with examples of research projects:

 Global health - People, animals, plants, the environment : towards an integrated approach to health (2019)
Marine and coastal sciences in Occitanie (2019)
Complex systems - From biology to landscapes (2019)
Viticulture and Wine (October 2016)
 Climate change: impact and adaptation (February 2015)
 Family farming (February 2014)
 Green technologies (February 2013)
 Agronomy - Crops and cropping systems (July 2010)
 Water resources - Preservation and management (March 2012).

References

External links
 Agropolis International website 
 Les "Dossiers d'Agropolis", thematic directories of research skills in Montpellier and Occitanie region
 Agropolis International members

Agriculture in France